The South African Springbok Championship Series was a sports car racing series based in Southern Africa.  The series ran from 1966 until 1973.  The series was cancelled after two rounds of the 1973 season due to the oil crisis, and never returned.  The series' signature event was the Kyalami 9 Hours.  The series was frequented by European teams and drivers, as it took place in November and December after the World Sportscar Championship and Can-Am seasons. The series did not crown a champion among drivers.

Seasons

1966

1967

1968

1969

1970

1971

1972

1973

External links
World Sports Racing Prototypes
Racing Sports Cars
The Springbok Series 1966–1967

Auto racing series in South Africa
Motorsport in Mozambique
Motorsport in Zimbabwe 
Motorsport in Africa 
Sports car racing series
1966 in motorsport
1967 in motorsport
1968 in motorsport
1969 in motorsport
1970 in motorsport
1971 in motorsport
1972 in motorsport
1973 in motorsport
Spring
Spring 
Spring
Spring 
Spring 
Spring
Spring
Spring